Beit Sira is a Palestinian village in the central West Bank, located 22 kilometers west of Ramallah and is a part of the Ramallah and al-Bireh Governorate. The village is situated along the Green Line. During the 1948 Arab-Israeli War, around 4,000 dunams of its land became a part of the "No-Man's Land" strip between the north-central West Bank and Israel. Currently Beit Sira's jurisdiction is 3,120 dunams, of which 441 dunams are built-up areas and the remainder is open spaces for future construction or agricultural land.

Location

It is bordered by Kharbatha al-Misbah, Beit Liqya, and Beit Ur al-Tahta to the east, Saffa to the north, the Green Line (the Armistice Line 1949) to the west, and Bayt Nuba to the south.

History

Ottoman Era

In the 1596 tax records, Beit Sira was a part of the nahiya ("subdistrict") of Ramla, part of Gaza Sanjak, in the Ottoman Empire, with a population of 17 Muslim household. The villagers paid a fixed tax-rate of 25% on agricultural products, including wheat, barley, summer crops, vineyards, fruit trees, goats and beehives, in addition to occasional revenues; a total of 4,500 akçe. All of the revenue went to a Waqf.

In 1838, it was noted as a Muslim village in the Ibn Humar District, part of the er-Ramleh area.

In 1863 Victor Guérin noted Beit Sira  as a considerable village on the summit of a rocky hill. A saint, revered under the name of Neby Sira, had a sanctuary there with his tomb. Socin, citing an official Ottoman village list compiled around 1870, noted that Bet Sira had 39 houses and a population of 125, though the population count included only men. Hartmann found that Bet Sira had 29 houses.

In 1883, the PEF's Survey of Western Palestine (SWP) described it: "A small village on a swell in the low hills. A main road passes through it. The water supply is artificial."

British Mandate era
In the 1922 census of Palestine conducted by the British Mandate authorities, Beit Sira had a population of 381  Muslims,  increasing in the 1931 census to 460 Muslims in 113 houses.

In the 1945 statistics the population was 540, all Muslims, while the total land area was 4,687 dunams, according to an official land and population survey. Of this, 205 dunams were plantations and irrigable land, 1,924 for cereals, while 23 dunams were classified as built-up (urban) areas.

Jordanian era
In the wake of the 1948 Arab–Israeli War, and after the 1949 Armistice Agreements, Beit Sira came under Jordanian rule.

The Jordanian census of 1961 found 746 inhabitants in Beit Sira.

Israeli occupation
Since the Six-Day War in 1967,  Beit Sira has been under Israeli occupation.

After the 1995 accords, 9.3% of Beit Sira land was classified as Area B, the remaining 90.7% as Area C. In 2012, approximately 78% of the village population worked in the Israel labor market. Israel has confiscated 1,499 dunams of land from Beit Sira for the construction of the Israeli settlement of Maccabim, presently part of Modi'in-Maccabim-Re'ut.

According to the Palestinian Central Bureau of Statistics, Beit Sira had a population of 2,840 inhabitants in 2006. In the 2007 PCBS census, there were 2,749 people living in the town.

References

Bibliography

External links
  Welcome To Bayt Sira
Survey of Western Palestine, Map 17:  IAA, Wikimedia commons 
 Beit Sira Village (Fact Sheet),  Applied Research Institute–Jerusalem (ARIJ)
   Beit Sira Village Profile, ARIJ
 Beit Sira,  aerial photo, ARIJ
 Locality Development Priorities and Needs in Beit Sira Village, ARIJ
The Israeli aggressive measures continue in Beit Sira village, POICA

Villages in the West Bank
Municipalities of the State of Palestine